is a 1988 Japanese anime fantasy martial arts adventure film and the third alternate continuity Dragon Ball feature film. It was released in on July 9, 1988 at the "Toei Manga Matsuri" film festival as part of a quadruple feature along with Bikkuriman 2: The Secret of Muen Zone, Tatakae!! Ramenman, and Kamen Rider Black: Terrifying! The Phantom House of Devil Pass.

Unlike the previous two Dragon Ball films, Mystical Adventure does not introduce any original characters, but instead adapts characters from the Red Ribbon Army and 22nd World Martial Arts Tournament story arcs from the manga into the film's original storyline.

Plot
Another retelling of the Dragon Ball story. This time, young Goku and young Krillin are training with Master Roshi for a World Martial Arts Tournament to be held in the country of Mifan. The Emperor of Mifan, Chiaotzu, is trying to find his lost "Ran Ran." "Minister" Master Shen has Emperor Pilaf work on a Dragon Radar, takes it from him, and is using it to locate the Dragon Balls. Shen and Mercenary Tao claim that they will use the wish from Shenron to locate Ran Ran, but are actually planning, with Tien's help, to kill Chiaotzu and take over the country. General Blue announces that Ran Ran is being held in Shen's room, and is killed by Tao for it. Bora and Upa have located the final Dragon Ball and they take it to Mifan to use it to demand that Mifan's soldiers be forced to leave the land near Korin Tower.

Bora is tricked into entering the Tournament (the winner of the Tournament will be granted one wish by Chiaotzu), and is then killed by Tao. Bulma, Oolong, Launch and Puar are looking for the other six Dragon Balls, so Bulma can wish for a boyfriend. However, when the Dragon Balls are located, they are accidentally dropped to the bottom of the moat surrounding Chiaotzu castle. Tien realizes that he likes Chiaotzu too much, and does not kill his friend; instead, he blows away Shen. Then he gives Chiaotzu back Ran Ran (actually a porcelain doll, not a real girl) telling him he had hidden her because of Shen and Tao. The story of Blue and Goku entering Penguin village is included, but this time it is Tao and Goku that meet Arale and Goku kills Tao with Arale's help. Goku throws the final ball into the moat, and summons Shenron, whom Upa asks to resurrect Bora.

Cast

Music
OP (Opening Theme):
"Makafushigi Adventure!"
Lyrics by 
Music by 
Arranged by Kōhei Tanaka
Performed by 
ED (Ending Theme):

Lyrics by Onikado Izumi
Music by 
Arranged by 
Performed by

Releases

Box office

English-language versions
Harmony Gold USA broadcast their dub of this film and Curse of the Blood Rubies as a double feature on WPSG Philly 57 in Philadelphia, Pennsylvania and on other channels and cable systems in a select few test markets. It was also likely to have been released on home video in the early 90s. It was not widely noticed and went under the radar. Their dub changed the names of some of the characters and had parts of it censored, and the opening and ending sequence changed with; instead of the first Japanese sequence they used the second Japanese sequence, with the Japanese katakana removed from the Dragon Balls, the Japanese credits removed and replaced with the Harmony Gold credits, and they changed some of the dialog from the Japanese intro. The ending was changed from the Japanese ending to show a still picture of Goku flying away from Shenron (known as Dragon God in the Harmony Gold dub) taken from the intro, and using the intro theme song instead of the Japanese ending theme with the Harmony Gold credits. The script was more faithful to the Japanese script and all the background music was kept the same, unlike the Funimation and AB Groupe dubs.

There was also another English dub released exclusively to Video CD by Speedy Video. This English version, produced and released exclusively in Malaysia, features an unknown cast and original music.

Funimation acquired the rights to the film in 2000 and released it with a new dub to VHS and bilingual DVD that year.

Madman Entertainment released the film on DVD in Australia and New Zealand on March 17, 2004 with the 2000 English dub and optional Japanese audio. However, the introduction, which began the narration of the Dragon Balls, a cameo sequence of Pilaf and his gang presenting a global dragon radar to Master Shen, and a different opening sequence to the film featuring Goku and Krillin in training were cut. Instead, the opening sequence and scenes aforementioned were replaced with the TV opening sequence. Another sequence cut was the closing credits featuring a summoned Shenron who fulfilled Upa's wish to bring Bora back to life. The scene was replaced with the TV closing sequence.

Subsequent versions of the FUNimation dub had restored its introduction and its opening/ending sequence. Unlike the Japanese version however, the opening sequence had many scenes in freeze-frame, as a way to block out the original Japanese credits that were in the sequence. The closing credits was restored with English credits censoring half the screen, also as a way to block out the original Japanese credits scrolling from the right.

The film was later available on DVD along with Sleeping Princess in Devil's Castle and Path to Power as part of FUNimation's Dragon Ball Movie Box set released on December 6, 2005. The box set was re-released as a thinpack on February 12, 2008. This set has since been discontinued.

The film was re-released to DVD in America on February 8, 2011 as a part of a Dragon Ball Movie 4-Pack remastered thinpack release from FUNimation along with the other Dragon Ball related films. This release restored all of the previously edited video footage of the film, but no apparent English credits are shown.

An alternative English dub produced with an uncredited cast by AB Groupe in France was released in English speaking markets in Europe in the early 2000s. It aired on Toonami in the UK in 2005.

The film was edited and combined with the second film, into a compilation film titled Dragon Ball, released in the Philippines by Regal Home Video in the mid/late 1990s.  The cast is believed to have also dubbed the original Dragon Ball series and the first 26 episodes of Dragon Ball Z exclusively for airing in the Philippines.

References

External links
 
 

Mystical Adventure
1988 films
1988 anime films
Funimation
Martial arts tournament films
Toei Animation films
Films about wish fulfillment
Films scored by Shunsuke Kikuchi
Japanese animated fantasy films
Japanese fantasy adventure films